Black Sheets of Rain is the second solo album by former Hüsker Dü guitarist and singer Bob Mould and features the Modern Rock Top 10 hit "It's Too Late." The album was a return to a heavier sound following his folk influenced solo debut, Workbook. Bassist Tony Maimone and drummer Anton Fier, both veterans of Pere Ubu, once again served as Mould's rhythm section.

Following this album, Mould would take a detour from his solo career to lead the band Sugar, before returning to it once again with his self-titled 1996 album.

Track listing
All tracks composed by Bob Mould.

 "Black Sheets of Rain" – 7:42
 "Stand Guard" – 5:31
 "It's Too Late" – 4:03
 "One Good Reason" – 6:18
 "Stop Your Crying" – 4:31
 "Hanging Tree" – 5:46
 "The Last Night" – 4:00
 "Hear Me Calling" – 4:57
 "Out of Your Life" – 3:33
 "Disappointed" – 4:10
 "Sacrifice/Let There Be Peace" – 5:34

Personnel
Bob Mould - vocals, guitar, keyboards, percussion
Tony Maimone - bass guitar
Anton Fier - drums, percussion

Charts
Album

Single

Notes 

Bob Mould albums
1990 albums
Albums produced by Bob Mould
Virgin Records albums